Groisman, Groysman are the Yiddish-language variants of the surname Grossman, variant transliterations of the Cyrillic spelling Гро́йсман, which comes from the pale of settlement in the region of Bessarabia of the Russian Empire.  Notable people with the surname include:

Volodymyr Groysman (born 1978), Ukrainian politician, former Prime Minister of Ukraine
Serginho Groisman, Brazilian television presenter and journalist
Yvonne Jospa, née Have Groisman (1910-2000), cofounder and leading organizer of the Comité de Défense des Juifs in September 1942 
L. Rafael Reif Groisman (born 1950),  Venezuelan-American electrical engineer, writer and academic administrator

See also
Groys

References

Yiddish-language surnames